Duke of Aiguillon (French: duc d'Aiguillon) was a title of French nobility in the peerage of France, first created in 1599 by Henry IV of France for Henry of Lorraine, son of Charles, Duke of Mayenne. The title takes its name from the town of Aiguillon.

List of Dukes of Aiguillon, 1599—1789

The title of Duke of Aiguillon was suppressed at the time of the French Revolution.

External links
 Duke of Aiguillon - heraldry
 European Heraldry page